Paboo & Mojies (Hangul: , , Katakana:) is a 2012 Korean-Japanese anime series produced by We've and Dong Woo Animation, based on the toys and franchise of the same name created by Daewon Media of South Korea and Sega Sammy Holdings of Japan. It is directed by Hiroshi Negishi (Saber Marionette R, NG Knight Lamune & 40) produced by Hideyuki Takai (The Cat Returns) and written by Mayori Sekijima (Clamp School Detectives). It premiered on KBS1 in Korea from May 5, 2012 to May 18, 2013 with a total of 52 episodes.

The series is primarily aimed on Preschoolers to teach basic English words and letters, with the entire series themed around the English alphabet. Nelvana licensed the series worldwide.

Story
Paboo is a young yet curious panda boy who lives in a magical land called Mojies Town. One day, he found a magical book up the Moji Tree and decides to get it. After he got the book, a magical fairy named Pappy popped out and told him about the book he found: The Mojires Book and also about the Magic Words that would help him and his friends in any situation. Now, Paboo and his friends all explore and solve problems in a quirky, imaginative, and sometimes zany world and discover each Magic Word with the help from Pappy.

Characters

Main Characters

The series's main protagonist, Paboo is a curious fun-loving male panda who loves adventures and exploring with his friends. He often keeps the Mojies book in his pocket and summons Puppy when there is a problem to call out the magic word. He is represented by the letter P.

The fairy who lives inside the Mojires book. He usually comes out whenever Paboo pulls out the book out of his pocket and uses the ability to call the magic word whenever there is a problem. He has no recollection on where he originally came from until it is revealed to once lived with the Goddess back at Fairy World.

Paboo's closest friend, a female  rabbit who wears a rainbow-colored bow on her head (originally wore a pink bow in the first episode). Rosie loves flowers but can be a little short-tempered sometimes. She is represented by the letter R.

Also one of Paboo's closest friends, a male dog who wears a blue hoodie with a doughnut on it. He is represented by the letter D.

Rosie's best friend, a female  elephant who often has an egg shell on her head. She is represented by the letter E

A male zebra  who is another of Paboo's best friends. He often wields a carrot like a sword (even though he eats it sometimes), and Hanna has a crush on him. He is represented by the letter Z.

The series's main antagonist, a male pig who attempts to steal the Mojies book from Paboo. Sometimes Peter bullies others or join Paboo and his friends to help him with his problems. In one episode, Peter finally got his hands on the Mojies book, but Paboo got it back from him.

Peter's sister, who helps him attempt to get the Mojies book.

Supporting Characters
Alice: The girl alligator who is a classmate in Mojiesgarten. She even loves to eat apples. Alice often cries when she has problems.
Bobby: The boy bear who is a classmate in Mojiesgarten.
Chris: The male camel who owns a cap and hat shop. He also acts like a detective when something goes wrong.
Frank: The boy flamingo who is a classmate in Mojiesgarten.
George: The male giraffe who loves to play guitar. He also owns a book shop.
Hanna: The girl hippo who is a classmate in Mojiesgarten. She even has a crush on Zorro. Hanna is also good friends of Rosie and Emma.
Ian: The male iguana who sells ice cream.
Jessie: The female jaguar who owns a jacket shop. She also loves juice.
Kerry: The girl kangaroo who is a classmate in Mojiesgarten. She is even a closest friend of Paboo.
Leo: The boy lion who is a classmate in Mojiesgarten. He is also good friends of Paboo, David, and Zorro.
M.C.: The male mouse who is an inventor and often wears a head-like tube.
Nancy: The female Nessie who lives in the waters of Mojies Town.
Oliver: The male orangutan who owns a toy shop.
Quincy: The female quail who loves flowers, just like Rosie. She even claims to be a queen.
Steve: The male snake who wears sunglasses and owns a sweets shop.
Tommy: The male tiger who is adventurous. Leo even has photos of him.
Uno: The male unicorn who owns an umbrella shop.
Venus: The girl vulture who is a classmate in Mojiesgarten. Her favorite instrument is the violin.
Walter: The male whale who lives in the waters of Mojies Town. In one episode, he even rode on the Moji Train with Paboo and friends.
Xeno: The male fox who owns an instrument shop. His favorite instrument is the xylophone.
York: The female yak who lives on a farm. She also makes yogurt.

Minor Characters
Lisa: A girl ladybug.
Daniel: A boy dragonfly.
Carol: A girl caterpillar.
Betty: A female butterfly.
Gil: A male grasshopper.
Brian: A boy beetle.
Billy: A boy bee.
Marie: A female mantis.
Susan: A female spider.
Simon: A boy stag beetle.
Pat: Paboo's mother. She is often kind and loves to make pancakes.
Paul: Paboo's father. Also the mail-carrier.
Cutie: The Mojiesgarten teacher. She is very kind and often wears a smile on her face.
Sebastian: Peter and Peggy's butler.
Smith: Quincy's assistant. He gets a little strict with her sometimes.
Moji Tree: A talking tree of Mojies Town.
Moji Train: The Mojies train that takes Paboo and his friends anywhere.
Kate: Kerry's mother.
Ellen: Emma's older sister.
Eddie: Emma's father and the doctor of the Mojies hospital.
Rachel: Rosie's mother.
Rose: Rosie's cousin. She also loves getting into mischief.
Hiehie: A female robot created by M.C. that David befriends.
Goddess: The mysterious female entity who owns the book of Mojies.

Media

Anime
The series began airing on BS Fuji in Japan from April 2, 2012 to March 30, 2013 and on KBS1 in Korea from May 5, 2012 to May 18, 2013 with a total of 52 11 minute episodes. The Japanese version is accompanied by a live educational interstitial titled . All the episodes of the series were uploaded to the anime's official YouTube account a few days after the series finished its airing in Korea.

Crossover Comic book
The series South Korea-Phillppines crossover legendary comic book published by Haksan Publishing, CJ ENM, Frontier Works Comics worldwide franchise superheroes Korean Version accompanied by a live-action in year 2019

Music
The series's is both composed by Shīki Yoshizumi and Kazuya Nishioka with cooperation from Snowmobile's. The opening song is titled "DA・BI・DA・GO!" by Shoko Haida and the ending song is titled  by mao.

Toys
Considered as the first collaborative effort between Daewon Media  and Sega Sammy Holdings, several toys and educational teaching tools were released during the series's airing. Some of the toys were also released by Takara Tomy.

References

External links
 Official Japanese Website 
 BS Fuji's Paboo & Mojires website 
 Paboo & Mojires at BS Fuji Hub 
 Series's official YouTube account 
 Official KBS1 Website for Paboo & Mojires 

2012 anime television series debuts
2013 Japanese television series endings
2010s South Korean animated television series
Slice of life anime and manga
Korean Broadcasting System original programming
Television series about pandas
Television about fairies and sprites
Animated television series about rabbits and hares
Animated television series about dogs
Animated television series about elephants
Fictional zebras
Animated television series about pigs
Animated preschool education television series
2010s preschool education television series